When We Two Parted may refer to:
"When We Two Parted", a poem of Lord Byron
"When We Two Parted", a song by The Afghan Whigs from their 1993 album Gentlemen